Tengku Sulaiman Shah Al-Haj ibni Almarhum Sultan Salahuddin Abdul Aziz Shah Al-Haj (born 17 June 1950) is a Malaysian corporate figure and a member of the Selangor Royal Family. He is the second son of eighth Sultan, Sultan Salahuddin Abdul Aziz Shah and the brother of the current Sultan, Sultan Sharafuddin Idris Shah.

Biography
Tengku Sulaiman Shah was born on 1 Ramadhan 1369 Hijrah, corresponding to 17 June 1950 at Istana Raja Muda Selangor in Kampung Baru, Kuala Lumpur which was the then-state capital of Selangor at that time. He is the fourth child and second son of the then-Raja Muda (Crown Prince) of Selangor, Tengku Abdul Aziz Shah (1926–2001) and his first wife, YMM Raja Saidatul Ihsan Binti Al-Marhum Tengku Badar Shah (Paduka Bonda Raja Selangor) (1923–2011). He was educated in Pakistan and the United Kingdom.

His father became the Sultan of Selangor on 1 September 1960, after the death of his grandfather Almarhum Sultan Hisamudin Alam Shah Alhaj and becoming Sultan Salahuddin Abdul Aziz Shah.

On 15 January 1972, the Sultan of Selangor, Sultan Salahuddin Abdul Aziz Shah Alhaj appointed Tengku Sulaiman Shah Alhaj as Tengku Panglima Besar and held the post for six years. 
On 1 August 1978, Sultan Salahuddin Abdul Aziz Shah Alhaj raised the rank of Tengku Sulaiman Shah Alhaj to Tengku Panglima Diraja and held the post for 38 years.

On 1 July 2016 Sultan Sharafuddin Idris Shah, Sultan of Selangor and also his eldest brother, promoted Tengku Sulaiman Shah Alhaj to Tengku Laksamana of Selangor.
He is also a member of The Council of the Royal Court of Selangor (Dewan Diraja Selangor).

Tengku Sulaiman Shah returned to Malaysia in 1970. In 1971, Sultan Salahuddin Abdul Aziz Shah Alhaj required him to work with the international advertising company SH Benson Sdn Bhd (later renamed as Ogilvy Benson & Mather (OBM) Sdn Bhd and latest Ogilvy & Mather Sdn Bhd). He was attached in Audio Visual department and gained wide knowledge in the advertising and branding industry. In 1975, he left the company and began venturing into the construction sector. He and other partners founded Syarikat Pembinaan Setia Sdn Bhd which later known as S P Setia a public listed company in the main board. In 1997, he relinquished his stake in the company. 
Tengku Sulaiman Shah Alhaj was formerly a Director of the following public listed companies:
1. Malaysian Resources Corporation Berhad (MRCB),
2. Samanda Holding Berhad,
3. MCB Holding Berhad,
4. SIME UEP,
5. Bina Goodyear Berhad, 
6. Baneng Holding Berhad,
7. KFC Holding (Malaysia) Berhad,
8. QSR Brands Bhd.
 he is the Director at Goodway Integrated Industries Berhad (GIIB), WTK Holding Berhad and LLC Berhad. Tengku Sulaiman Shah is the Chairman of Malaysia - UAE Business Council appointed by Ministry of International Trade and Industry (Malaysia) (MITI).

Tengku Sulaiman Shah Alhaj's interests includes photography and travelling. He is a food lover, particular to Middle Eastern, Japanese, and Western foods. 

On 2 May 1977, he married the Tunku Puteri of Johor, Tunku Kamariah Aminah Maimunah Iskandariah (born 11 July 1956), the eldest daughter of the former Sultan of Johor, Sultan Iskandar and also eldest sister of the current Sultan of Johor, Sultan Ibrahim Ismail. 
In 1982, she was conferred the title of Tunku Puteri Johor by her father. She also received the title Tengku Puan Laksamana of Selangor.

Honours of Tengku Sulaiman Shah 

He has been awarded :

Honours of Selangor

  Knight Grand Commander of the Order of the Crown of Selangor (SPMS) - Dato' Seri (8 March 1983)
  Second Class of the Royal Family Order of Selangor (DK II) (10 April 2003)

Honours of Malaysia
  : 
  Recipient of the Installation of Sultan Salahuddin Abdul Aziz Shah as XI Agong of Malaysia Coronation Medal (26 April 1999)
  : 
  Commander of the Royal Family Order of Johor (DK II) (8 April 1984)
  Grand Commander of the Royal Family Order of Johor (DK I) (22 November 2013)
  Knight Grand Commander of the Order of the Crown of Johor (SPMJ) – Dato'
  Sultan Ibrahim Coronation Medal (PIS) (23 March 2015)
  : 
  Knight Grand Commander of the Order of the Life of the Crown of Kelantan or Star of Ismail (SJMK) – Dato' (30 March 1986)

Honours of Tunku Kamariah 

She has been awarded :

Honours of Johor

  Commander of the Royal Family Order of Johor (DK II) 
 Grand Commander of the Royal Family Order of Johor (DK I)
  Knight Grand Commander of the Order of the Crown of Johor (SPMJ) – Datin Paduka

Ancestry

References

1950 births
Living people
Royal House of Selangor
Malaysian people of Malay descent
Second Classes of Royal Family Order of Selangor
Knights Grand Commander of the Order of the Crown of Selangor
Malaysian people of Bugis descent
Malaysian socialites
Malaysian businesspeople
Sons of monarchs

Knights Grand Commander of the Order of the Crown of Johor